Minervarya greenii (common names: montane frog, Sri Lanka paddy field frog) is a species of frog that is endemic to the hills of central Sri Lanka. It lives in wetland habitats within montane tropical moist forests. It is threatened by habitat loss, pollution, desiccation of wetlands, forest fires as well as predation by introduced rainbow trout.

References

greenii
Frogs of Sri Lanka
Endemic fauna of Sri Lanka
Amphibians described in 1905
Taxobox binomials not recognized by IUCN